Pitel is a surname. People with this surname include:

 Edwige Pitel (born 1967), French cyclist
 Françoise Pitel (1662–1721), French actress
 Serhiy Pitel (born 1995), Ukrainian football player